Bufuralol is a potent beta-adrenoceptor antagonist with partial agonist activity. It is metabolized by CYP2D6.

Most beta blockers are aryloxypropanolamine-based. In this rare exception, the benzofuran oxygen is part of a ring instead of derived from the epichlorohydrin precursor.

References

Beta blockers
Benzofuranethanamines
N-tert-butyl-phenoxypropanolamines